Oversoul may refer to:

Philosophy and religion
 "The Over-Soul" (1841), an essay by Ralph Waldo Emerson 
 A translation of the Vedic term Paramatman

Arts, entertainment and media
 The Oversoul, a character in The Homecoming Saga, a science fiction series by Orson Scott Card
 OverSoul, an Artix Entertainment Game
 Oversoul, a shamanic technique in the manga Shaman King
 Oversoul, the telepathic voice to which all Dals are attuned in The Malloreon series of books by David Eddings
 Oversoul, the collective consciousness of an organization's holdings and records in the Achaea, Dreams of Divine Lands video game
 Artificial oversoul, a term used in The Wheels of Chance by H. G. Wells
 Oversoul, the name of a painting by Alex Grey